A forest railway, forest tram, timber line, logging railway or logging railroad is a mode of railway transport which is used for forestry tasks, primarily the transportation of felled logs to sawmills or railway stations.

In most cases this form of transport utilised narrow gauges, and were temporary in nature, and in rough and sometimes difficult to access terrain.

History 
Before the railway was invented, logs were transported in large numbers from the forest down rivers either freely or on wooden rafts. This was not without its problems and wood was often damaged in transit, lost in floods or stranded in shallow water. Suitable rivers were often unavailable in mountainous terrain.

Simple wagonways, using horses and wooden rails, were used from the 18th century. However the invention of the steam locomotive and steel rails soon led to these being employed for forestry. However the difficult terrain within forests meant that narrow-gauge railways, which took up less space, were lighter and easier to build and enabled tight curves to be laid, were preferred. These were the so-called forest railways. In particularly large areas of forest or forests of unusually large trees, such as in the northwestern USA, extensive forest railways were even built using standard gauge exclusively for forestry tasks. Special geared locomotives such as the Shay and Climax locomotive were developed for high tractive effort on rough track. Some forest railways became common carriers when cleared forest land was converted to agricultural or recreational use.

In cases where the railway itself was considered very short-term, or the region was extremely difficult to access, logs would often be laid into the ground as a pole road, rather than the cost and logistics of laying steel rails and sleepers. Pole roads could be extensive; several examples in the southeastern United States extended up to 20 miles at the end of the nineteenth century, and used purpose-built steam locomotives.

In addition to steam traction, diesel and petrol-driven locomotives were also used later on. These largely brought animal-hauled transportation to an end on the forest railways. Also common were routes that just used gravity. Wagons loaded with wood would simply roll downhill in a controlled fashion under the pull of gravity. Foresters also travelled on these, at some risk to their lives on occasions – as brakemen. Empty wagons were hauled uphill again by horses.

From the second half of the 20th century forest railways were threatened by road transportation and by the end of the 1960s they had practically disappeared from western Europe. Roads were often laid in their place on the old trackbeds.

In a few Eastern European countries forest railways survived longer, particularly in Russia where there are still some today. In Hungary too there are several forest railways in active service today, some are also used for tourist traffic. The numerous forest railway operations in Romania were closed, with a few exceptions, by the 1990s. In Western Europe there are very few which are even preserved as museum railways.

In Asia and Oceania (Australia and New Zealand) the history and fate of logging tramways/forest railways is similar to Europe, with most lines either converted to motorised truck transport or closing down in the 1960s.  Significant numbers of locomotives and other remnants of the former lines are found in museums and museum railways in Australia.

Forest railways in Europe

Germany (selection)

Austria

France 
 Abreschviller Forest Railway, remains of a once extensive forest railway networks in the Vosges, museum railway
 also the Voies Ferrées des Landes a group of short lines built primarily to serve the forestry industry in the Landes forest
 The Forest Railway Welschbruch, built and used while the German Empire ruled Alsace, was used to carry wood logs down to the valley of Barr

Poland 
(all lines on the Polish eastern border from north to south)
 Forest Railway from Płociczno - Bryzgiel (from 1923)
 Forest Railway from Czarna Białostocka (from 1919)
 Forest Railway Hajnówka, Museum Railway
 Bieszczady Forest Railway

Slovakia 
 Hronec – Čierny Balog Forest Railway (Schwarzgranbahn), museum railway
 Vychylovka Forest Railway, museum railway
 Považská lesná železnica

Sweden 
 Ohsabanan, Värnamo, Småland, active forest railway and tourist trains

Hungary 

 Almamellék Forest Railway, tourist trains
 Csömödér Forest Railway, active forest railway and tourist trains
 Debrecen Forest Railway, tourist trains
 Felsőtárkány National Forest Railway, tourist trains
 Gemenc State Forest Railway, active forest railway and tourist trains
 Mátravasút, (Gyöngyös) tourist trains
 Kaszó Forest Railway, tourist trains
 Kemence Forest Railway, tourist trains and narrow gauge museum
 Királyrét Forest Railway, tourist trains
 Lillafüred Forest Railway, tourist trains
 Mesztegnyő Forest Railway, (forest railway ceased 1999) tourist trains
 Nagybörzsöny Forest Railway, tourist trains
 Pálháza Forest Railway, tourist trains
 Szilvásvárad Forest Railway, Szilvásvárad, tourist trains

Romania 
 Viseu de Sus, Wassertalbahn, active forest railway used for forestry and tourism
 Covasna - Comandău Forest Railway, with cable car, museum operation under construction

Russia

 Alapayevsk narrow-gauge railway, passengers and tourist trains
 Apsheronsk narrow-gauge railway, active forest railway used for forestry
 Belorucheiskaya narrow-gauge railway, active forest railway used for forestry
 Kobrinskaya narrow-gauge railway, active forest railway used for forestry
 Konetsgorskaya narrow-gauge railway, active forest railway used for forestry
 Kudemskaya narrow-gauge railway, passengers and tourist trains
 Loyginskaya narrow-gauge railway, active forest railway used for forestry
 Nyubskaya narrow-gauge railway, active forest railway used for forestry
 Lundanskaya narrow gauge railway, active forest railway used for forestry
 Oparinskaya narrow-gauge railway, active forest railway used for forestry
 Pizhemskaya narrow gauge railway, active forest railway used for forestry
 Sharya Forest Museum Railway, passengers and tourist trains
 Udimskaya narrow-gauge railway, active forest railway used for forestry
 Zelennikovskaya narrow-gauge railway, active forest railway used for forestry

Logging railroads in North America 
A logging railroad describes railroads, pole roads, tram roads, or similar infrastructure used to transport harvested timber from a logging site to a sawmill. Logging railroads vary in gauge and length, with most forested regions of the world supporting a railroad of this type at some point.

While most railroads of this variety were temporary, it was not uncommon for permanent railroads to take their place as a complement to logging operations or as an independent operation once logging ended.

Canada

British Columbia 

 Englewood Railway

Ontario
 Emery Lumber Company railway, Greater Sudbury
 Stone Lumber Company railway, St. Joseph Island

Saskatchewan
 Shaw Logging Railroad

Nova Scotia
 Springfield Railway
 Weymouth and New France Railway

Mexico 
 Ferrocarril Cazadero la Torre y Tepetongo
 Bosques de Chihuahua

United States

California 
 Almanor Railroad
 Arcata and Mad River Railroad
 Bear Harbor and Eel River Railroad
 Boca and Loyalton Railroad
 Bucksport and Elk River Railroad
 California Western Railroad
 Camino, Placerville and Lake Tahoe Railroad
 Caspar, South Fork and Eastern Railroad
 Diamond and Caldor Railway
 Diamond Match Company
 Feather River Railway
 Fort Bragg and Southeastern Railroad
 Goodyear Redwood Company
 Lake Valley Railroad
 Madera Sugar Pine Company
 McCloud Railway
 Mendocino Lumber Company
 Metropolitan Redwood Lumber Company
 Michigan-California Lumber Company
 North Pacific Coast Railroad
 Oregon and Eureka Railroad
 Pacific Lumber Company
 Rockport Redwood Company
 Santa Cruz Lumber Company
 Sugar Pine Lumber Company
 Usal Redwood Company
 West Side Lumber Company railway
 Yosemite Lumber Company

Nevada 
 Carson and Tahoe Lumber and Fluming Company

New England

New Mexico
 Alamogordo and Sacramento Mountain Railway

Oregon
 Oregon, California and Eastern Railway
 Oregon, Pacific and Eastern Railway
 Sumpter Valley Railroad

South Carolina
 Argent Lumber Company

West Virginia
 Cass Scenic Railroad State Park

Washington
 Chehalis Western Railroad
 Siler Logging Railroad
 White River Lumber Co

Forest railways in Asia

Indonesia 
 Cepu Forest Railway

Taiwan 
 Alishan Forest Railway

Japan 
 Yakushima/Arakawa Forest Railway
 Kiso Forest Railway

Forest railways in Oceania

Australia 
 Powelltown Tramway, Victoria
 Tyers Valley Tramway, Victoria
 Timber railway lines of Western Australia

New Zealand 
 Ellis and Burnand Tramway, Ongarue
 Brownlee Tramway, in operation from c.1881 through to 1915

Other railways for the transport of goods 
 Field railways (see: Feldbahn) for the transportation of rural produce; also originally for military use as well
 Harbour or port railways for loading and unloading goods within a port
 Industrial railways for transporting goods from factories
 Hallig railways for transporting coastal defence materiel.
 Bush tramways in New Zealand, see West coast trams in New Zealand
 Light railway
 Military railways (see also: Heeresfeldbahn) for transporting military supplies and troops
 Mining railways for ore transportation
 Tramway (industrial)
 Wagonway
 Rail transport

Notes

Sources 
 Manfred Hohn, Waldbahnen in Österreich, Verlag Slezak 1989, 
 L.Reiner/H.Beiler/R.Sliwinski, Die Spiegelauer Forest Railway, Ohetaler Verlag Riedlhütte 2005, 
 Friedemann Tischer, Die Muskauer Waldeisenbahn, Verlag Kenning, Nordhorn 2003,

External links 

 Overview of forest railways in Slovakia
 Photos from the Spiegelau Forest Railway today

Narrow gauge railways
Railway